South Carolina Highway 62 (SC 62) was a state highway that existed in the northwestern part of Richland County and the northeastern part of Lexington County. It served to connect Ballentine with St. Andrews, via Irmo.

Route description
SC 62 began at an intersection with U.S. Route 76 (US 76) and SC 2 east-southeast of Ballentine. It traveled to the south-southeast to an intersection with SC 60 in Irmo. It continued its south-southeast direction and curved to a nearly due-east direction before it ended at the Lexington–Richland county line at St. Andrews.

History
SC 62 was established in 1940. It was decommissioned in 1947. It was downgraded to secondary roads.

Major intersections

See also

References

External links
Former SC 62 at the Virginia Highways South Carolina Annex

062 (1940s)
Transportation in Richland County, South Carolina
Transportation in Lexington County, South Carolina